Nandur Madhmeshwar Bird Sanctuary is located at Niphad Tehsil of Nashik District, known as the Bharatpur of Maharashtra.

It is designated as Ramsar site and it's a Maharashtra's first Ramsar site.

A stone pickup is constructed across river Godavari at Nandur Madhmeshwar. This resulted into the formation of rich environment for biological diversity. Many  species of plants like Babul, Tamarind, Neem, Jamun, Vilayati, Maharukh, Pangara, Mango, Eucalyptus, are found here, also some aquatic plant species are available.

Gallery

Wetland of International importance
The International Ramsar Convention on Wetlands has declared Nandur Madhameshwar wetland in Niphad tahsil of Nashik district as Ramsar wetland. This is the first wetland in the state and among the Seventy-five wetlands in India declared by the Convention as Ramsar sites on January 27, days ahead of International Wetlands Day on February 2.
“Nandur Madhmeshwar wetland has been formed by shallow backwaters of Nandur Madhmeshwar dam and is known as Maharashtra ‘s Bharatpur. It lies in the 100 sq km Nandur Madhameshwar sanctuary formed in 1986,” said Principal Chief Conservator of Forest (Wildlife) Nitin Kakodkar.

See also
 List of lakes in India
 List of national parks of India
 Ramsar Convention
 Tiger reserves of Maharashtra

References

Bird sanctuaries of Maharashtra
Wildlife sanctuaries in Maharashtra
Ramsar sites in India
Tourist attractions in Nashik district
2020 establishments in Maharashtra
Protected areas established in 2020